The Colossus of Nero (Colossus Neronis) was a  bronze statue that the Emperor Nero (37–68 AD) created in the vestibule of his Domus Aurea, the imperial villa complex which spanned a large area from the north side of the Palatine Hill, across the Velian ridge to the Esquiline Hill. It was modified by Nero's successors into a statue of the sun god Sol. The statue was eventually moved to a spot outside the Flavian Amphitheatre, which (according to one of the more popular theories) became known, by its proximity to the Colossus, as the Colosseum.

The last mention of the Colossus is in an illuminated manuscript from the late 4th century AD. The statue disappeared sometime afterwards, likely toppled by an earthquake or destroyed during the Sack of Rome, although some sources indicate the statue may have remained standing as late as the 7th century AD. Today, the only remnants of the statue are some concrete blocks that once made up the foundation of its marble pedestal.

History

The statue was placed just outside the main palace entrance at the terminus of the Via Appia in a large atrium of porticoes that divided the city from the private villa. The Greek architect Zenodorus designed the statue and began construction between AD 64 and 68.

Shortly after Nero's death in AD 68, the Emperor Vespasian added a radiate crown and renamed it Colossus Solis, after the Roman sun god Sol. Around 128, Emperor Hadrian ordered the statue moved from the Domus Aurea to just northwest of the Colosseum in order to create space for the Temple of Venus and Roma. It was moved by the architect Decriannus with the use of 24 elephants. Emperor Commodus converted it into a statue of himself as Hercules by replacing the head, but after his death it was restored, and so it remained.

The last certain mention from antiquity of the statue is the reference in the Chronography of 354.  Today, nothing remains of the Colossus of Nero save for the foundations of the pedestal at its second location near the Colosseum. It was possibly destroyed during the Sack of Rome in 410, or toppled in one of a series of fifth-century earthquakes, and its metal scavenged. However, it is also possible that the statue was still standing during the Middle Ages, because a poem by Bede (c. 672–735) says: As long as the Colossus stands, Rome will stand, when the Colossus falls, Rome will also fall, when Rome falls, so falls the world.

The remains of the brick-faced masonry pedestal, once covered with marble, were removed in 1936 on the orders of Benito Mussolini. The foundations were excavated in 1986, and can be viewed by the public.

Connection to the Colosseum
According to one theory, the name of the Roman amphitheatre, the Colosseum, is derived from this statue.

Bede (c. 672–735) wrote a famous epigram celebrating the symbolic significance of the statue: 

This is often mistranslated to refer to the Colosseum rather than the Colossus (as in, for instance, Byron's poem Childe Harold's Pilgrimage). However, at the time that Bede wrote, the masculine noun  was applied to the statue rather than to what was still known as the Amphitheatre.

Gallery

See also
List of tallest statues

References 

1st-century Roman sculptures
Buildings and structures completed in the 1st century
Buildings and structures demolished in the 5th century
Buildings and structures demolished in the 7th century
Ancient Roman buildings and structures in Rome
Nero
Hadrianic building projects
Demolished buildings and structures in Italy
Sol Invictus
Ancient Greek and Roman colossal statues